The Morro Jable Lighthouse is an active lighthouse on the Canary island of Fuerteventura. The lighthouse is situated at the edge of the beach near the town and resort of Morro Jable.

Description 
Completed in 1991 this is the tallest lighthouse in the Canaries with a 59 m tower, which is higher than that of the Maspalomas Lighthouse on Gran Canaria at 56 m, and that of Pechiguera on Lanzarote at 50 m.

With a focal height of 62 m above the sea, its light can be seen for 17 nautical miles, and consists of two flashes of white light every 10 seconds.

It is sometimes confused with the older 19th century Punta Jandía lighthouse which lies 22 km away by road at the extreme western end of the Jandia peninsula.

See also 

 List of lighthouses in Spain
 List of lighthouses in the Canary Islands
 List of tallest lighthouses in the world

References

External links 
 
 Comisión de faros
 Autoridad Portuaria de Las Palmas de Gran Canaria

1991 establishments in Spain
Lighthouses completed in 1991
Lighthouses in Fuerteventura